Kargin Haghordum (Wholesome Program) was an Armenian comedy television show airing on the Armenia TV channel. It was one of the most popular and successful comedy shows in post-independent Armenian history. The show consisted of few-minute-long sketches which were usually about cheating of married couples, social problems in Armenia, football, World War II, etc.

References

External links 
 

Armenian comedy television series
2003 Armenian television series debuts
2009 Armenian television series endings
Armenia TV original programming
2000s Armenian television series